The Indian Defence services have established numerous academies and staff colleges across India for the purpose of training professional soldiers in military sciences, warfare command and strategy, and associated technologies.

Education and training

Rashtriya Indian Military College: The Rashtriya Indian Military College (RIMC), Dehradun was founded on 13 March 1922 with the object of providing necessary preliminary recruit training for Indians wishing to become officers in Indian Armed Forces. The institution now runs school classes from 8th to 12th on 10+2 CBSE pattern and serves as a feeder institution to the National Defence Academy, Khadakwasla (Pune), where males who have passed 12th class of school are taken as cadets to receive their initial training for the Army, Navy and Air Force.
Chail Military School Chail (oldest one) (Previously known as King George Royal Indian Military College) Shimla.
Ajmer Military School Ajmer (Found 1930) (Previously known as King George Royal Indian Military College) Ajmer
Bangalore Military School (Erstwhile King George Military School, Bangalore and now Rashtriya Military School, Bangalore)
Belgaum Military School
Dholpur Military School

Sainik School: The Sainik Schools are asystem of schools in India established and managed by the Sainik Schools Society under Ministry of Defence. They were conceived in 1961 by V. K. Krishna Menon, the then Defence Minister of India, to rectify the regional and class imbalance amongst the Officer cadre of the Indian Military, and to prepare students mentally and physically for entry into the National Defence Academy (NDA), Khadakwasla, Pune and Indian Naval Academy (INA), Ezhimala, Kerala. Today there are 33 such schools running and proposed for future covering all the states of the country.

Integrated national institute
Indian National Defence University at Gurugram in Haryana is likely to commence courses from 2018-19 as an autonomous integrated national institute. At least 66% students will be from the Indian Armed Forces and the remaining 33% will be from the Paramilitary forces of India, Police in India and civilians. Functioning on the similar principals as Indian Institutes of Technology (IITs) and Indian Institutes of Management (IIMs), the university will offer post-graduate studies, doctoral and post-doctoral research as well as higher studies through distance learning to military and civilians to be imparted by the mixed teaching faculty composed of military officials and civilians in the ratio of 1:1.

Courses will include war gaming and simulation, neighborhood studies, counter insurgency and counter terrorism, Chinese studies, evaluation of strategic thought, international security issues, maritime security studies, Eurasian studies, South East Asian studies, material acquisition, joint logistics, and national security strategy in peace and war.

Following existing institutes will be affiliated to the university:
 National Defence College (NDC) New Delhi
 College of Defence Management (CDM) Secunderabad
 Defence Services Staff College (DSSC), Wellington
 Military Institute of Technology (MILIT), Pune
 National Defence Academy (NDA) Khadakwasla

Indian Army

The chief institutions training Indian Army officers are:

 Army War College: It is the premier All Arms Tactical Training Institution for officers and performs important functions of evaluation of concepts and doctrines in the fields of tactics and operational logistics. The institution was earlier known as College of Combat, Mhow and has been re-designated as Army War College, Mhow from 1 January 2003.
 Infantry School: The Infantry School, Mhow is the largest and the oldest military training centre of the Indian Army. The institution is responsible for developing the complete spectrum of tactical drills and concepts pertaining to infantry operating in varied terrain and environment and introduce them from time to time. This institution also trains the National Shooting Team under the aegis of Army Marksmanship Unit (AMU) which is part of Infantry School.
 Junior Leaders Wing: The Junior Leaders Wing, Belgaum is part of Infantry School, Mhow and trains junior officers and junior leaders in sub-unit level in tactical and special mission techniques to enable them to carry out assigned operational missions.
 Indian Military Academy: The Indian Military Academy (IMA), Dehradun is credited with providing excellent officers who are highly disciplined, thoroughly motivated and deeply committed to serve the Nation with honour and dignity. The valediction of the Academy is evident from the bountiful sagas of bravery, valour and sacrifice displayed by its alumni in times of crisis.
  Officers Training Academy, Chennai: Officers Training Academy transforms young graduates into commissioned Officers armed with requisite military knowledge, leadership skills and morals & ethics of highest order. It is that prestigious gateway to the Army which equips the young minds to fight & win for our country with panache, second to none. 
 Officers Training Academy, Gaya:- OTA Gaya, raised in July 2011, is the third pre-commission training (PCT) academy of the Indian Army with a planned training capacity of 750 cadets. It imparts pre commission military training to regular army officers from Technical and SCO entries. The Officers Training Academy (OTA) in Gaya is being shut down as it is not used to its full potential and the Sikh Light Infantry Regimental Centre, which is strapped for space at Fatehgarh in Uttar Pradesh, will shift there.
 High Altitude Warfare School: The High Altitude Warfare School (HAWS), Gulmarg is a training establishment imparting specialised Mountain Warfare and Winter Warfare Training to Indian Army personnel.
 Armoured Corps Centre and School: The Armoured Corps Centre and School (ACCS), Ahmednagar is a premier institution of the Army. It imparts training pertaining to employment of mechanical forces in battle and development of concepts for future battle.
 School of Artillery: School of Artillery, Deolali Nasik district, Maharashtra is a premier institution of the Army and imparts effective training, evaluation of new equipment for induction and development of new concepts/ doctrine for application of artillery fire.
 Army Air Defence College: The Army Air Defence College (AADC), Gopalpur imparts training for provision of effective Air Defence Artillery protection to ground forces against long and medium altitude enemy air attacks and also to preserve specified tactical and strategic vital areas and pivotal points from critical danger and destruction from enemy air attacks.
 College of Military Engineering: The role of College of Military Engineering (CME), Pune encompasses three aspects, i.e., training, advisory, projects research and experimentation.
 Military College of Telecommunication Engineering: The Military College of Telecommunication Engineering (MCTE), Mhow is a premiere training institute of the Corps of Signals. A variety of courses catering for the training needs in Information Technology and Communication for the Indian Army are conducted at MCTE.
 Counter-Insurgency and Jungle Warfare School (India) (CIJW School): The CIJW School in Vairengte, Mizoram, is an institution for counter-guerilla training. The institution has risen to be the nodal agency for imparting counter-insurgency training for the other branches.
 Junior Leader's Academy (JLA), Bareilly and Ramgarh: The Junior Leader's Academy (JLA), Bareilly and Ramgarh conduct institutionalised leadership training for Junior Leaders, who are Junior Commissioned Officers and Non-Commissioned Officers of the Army.
 Army Service Corps (ASC) Centre and College: The ASC Centre and College, Bangalore imparts training to Officers, personnel below officer rank of Army Service Corps and other arms and services indicating personnel from foreign countries in various disciplines of Suppliers, Fuel, Oil and Lubricants, Mechanical Transport, Animal Transport and Air dispatch. The Centre also trains recruits for induction into service into Army Service Corps.
 Army Medical Corps (AMC) Centre and School: The AMC Centre and School, Lucknow conducts from basic to advance courses for Army Medical Corps and Military Nursing Service Officers. The Centre also trains recruits for induction into service into Army Medical Corps.
 College of Materials Management (CMM), Jabalpur: The College of Materials Management (CMM), Jabalpur is the hub centre of all logistics courses for Army. It runs courses like advance material management, higher munition course and quarter master courses for officers, JCOs and NCOs. It also imparts basic training to technical clerks.
 Military College of Electronics and Mechanical Engineering: The Military College of Electronics and Mechanical Engineering (MCEME), Secunderabad (Hyderabad, Telangana) is an institution of technical education in the Army. The College was awarded the Golden Peacock National Training Award (1997) as well as Golden Peacock National Quality Award.
 Remount and Veterinary Corps (RVC) Centre and School: The RVC Centre and School, Meerut Cantt, imparts basic military and technical training to young veterinary graduates on commission and to various technical tradesmen of the corps like Dressors, Riders, Ferriers, Army Dog trainers and lab attendants. The Centre also trains recruits for induction into service into Remount and Veterinary Corps Centre and School.
 Army Education Corps (AEC) Training College and Centre: The AEC Training College and Centre, Pachmarhi is a Category 'A' establishment, a Regimental Training Centre for AEC personnel and an Autonomous College affiliated to Barkatullah University, Bhopal.
 Corps of Military Police (CMP) Centre and School: The CMP Centre and School, Bangalore imparts basic military training to all personnel enrolled in Corps of Military Police and also conduct courses for officers on deputation to the corps.
 Army School of Physical Training: The Army School of Physical Training (ASPT), Pune runs the Sports Training Course for Army personnel, central police organisation and paramilitary forces to train instructors capable of imparting physical training and sports coaching at appropriate level.
 Army Airborne Training School: The Army Airborne Training School (AATS), Agra imparts training in aerial delivery and air transportation of men and material. It is also responsible for carrying out Research and Trial pertaining to air portability and para dropping of all types of equipment.
 Institute of National Integration: The Institute of National Integration (INI), Pune imparts training to Officers, Personnel Below Officer Rank and Religious Teachers. Its focus is on instilling a sense of national and cultural unity in the officer corps.
 Institute of Military Law: The Institute of Military Law (IML), Kamptee is a Tri-Services Institute which imparts training to officers of Judge Advocate General Branch of the Army, Navy, Air Force and Coast Guard as well as officers and other ranks of other arms and services in military and allied laws. The Institute is the only Institute in Asia which imparts both practical and theoretical training in military law and its procedure.
 Army Sports Institute: The Army Sports Institute (ASI) at Pune and Army Sports Nodes is a public-relations sports centre, intended for portraying the Army in a positive light. Appropriate funds have been earmarked for the construction and equipment coupled with food habitat, advertising and training under foreign coaches.
 Army Cadet College: Army Cadet College (ACC), Dehradun is a Wing of the IMA which caters for training of service cadets selected for commission. On completion of the course, these cadets also qualify for a B.A. or B.Sc. degree, recognised by the Jawaharlal Nehru University.
 Combat Army Aviation Training School (CAATS): CAATS is the main training course for aviators of the air wing of the Army, The Army Aviation Corps. It is located at the Army Aviation Base in Nashik Road. It replaced the Indian Air Force's academy, the Helicopter Training School (HTS), as the main training school for army aviators. It mainly operates Cheetahs and Chetaks and also has Simulators.

Others include:
Army Clerks Training School, Aurangabad
Army School of Mechanical Transport, Bangalore
Army/ Air Transport Support School, Agra
EME School, Vadodara
Military School of Music - Pachmarhi

Indian Navy

The Indian Navy has numerous training establishments at various places.  The Indian Naval Academy is presently located in Ezhimala, near Kannur in Kerala State.

Indian Naval Academy (Officers Training) - Ezhimala
 Naval War College, Goa
INS Agrani (Leadership Training) - Coimbatore
INS Chilka (Sailors Training) - Chilka
INS Dronacharya (Gunnery School) - Kochi
INS Garuda (Aviation) - Kochi
INS Hamla (Logistics Training) - Mumbai
Institute of Naval Medicine - Mumbai
INS Kunjali (Music Training School) - Mumbai
INS Mandovi (Provost and Physical Training School) - Goa
Naval Institute of Educational and Training Technology (NIETT) - Kochi
National Institute of Hydrography - Goa
INS Shivaji (Engineering Training) - Lonavla
ShipWright School - Visakhapatnam
INS Valsura (Electrical Training) - Jamnagar
INS Venduruthy (Seamen Training) - Kochi
INS Satavahana (Submarine School) - Visakhapatnam
Helicopter Training School - INS Rajali

Indian Air Force
The Indian Air Force has a Training Command and several training establishments. While technical and other support staff are trained at the various Ground Training Schools, the pilots are trained at the Air Force Academy located at Dundigal, near Hyderabad, Telangana.

For Officers
 College of Air Warfare - Secunderabad (Hyderabad) 
 Tactics and Air Combat Development Establishment (TACDE) - Gwalior
 Flying Instructors School - Tambaram
 Pilot Training Establishment - Allahabad 
 Air Force Administrative College - Coimbatore 
 Institute of Aero-Space Medicine - Bangalore 
 Air Force Technical Training College - Jalahalli, near Bangalore 
 Paratrooper's Training School - Agra
 Indian Air Force Test Pilot School - Bangalore
 TETTRA Schools - Pune, Chandigarh, Dundigal
 Air Defence College - Memaura (near Lucknow)

For Airmen 
 Basic Training Institute - Belgaum
 Mechanical Transport Training Institute (MTTI) -  Avadi
 Workshop Training Institute (WTI) - Tambaram
 Mechanical Training Institute (MTI) - Tambaram
 Electronic Training Institute (ETI) - Jalahalli, near Bangalore
 Electric & Instrumentation Training Institute (EITI) - Jalahalli, near Bangalore
 Communication Training Institute (CTI) - Jalahalli, near Bangalore
 Air Force Police & Security Training Institute (AFP&STI) - Avadi
 Non-Technical Training Institute (NTTI) - Belgaum
 Air Force School of Physical Fitness (AFSPF) - Belgaum
 Medical Training Centre (MTC) - Agram Post, Bangalore
 Garud Regimental Training Centre (GRTC) - Chandinagar

Indian Coast Guard
As of now Indian Coast Guard Navik (sailors) Cadets are trained at INS Chilka and other naval establishments. Officer cadets are currently trained at Indian Naval Academy. In coming years, the new Indian Coast Guard Academy is coming up at Mangalore.

Indian Coast Guard Academy - Mangalore (Upcoming)
Coast Guard Flying Training Squadron - Daman and Helicopter Training School INS Rajali, jointly trained with Indian Navy helicopter pilot cadre - Arakkonam

Tri-service Institutions
National Defence College: The National Defence College (NDC) inaugurated on 27 April 1960 is the only institution in the country that imparts knowledge on all aspects of national security and strategy. Senior Defence and Civil Service Officers participate in a 47-week comprehensive programme of national security and strategy.
College of Defence Management: The Institute of Defence Management (IDM), Secunderabad(Hyd) was established in June 1970 to impart modern, scientific management training to the Armed Forces Officers. The IDM was renamed as College of Defence Management (CDM) in 1980. The College has trained over 5,000 officers of the rank of Major to Major General and equivalents of the three Services through its on-campus programmes. It has also given exposure in defence management to a large number of officers through external capsules. Officers from Para-Military Forces, Ministry of Defence, Research and Development Organisations and friendly foreign countries also attend various on-campus programmes. 
Defence Services Staff College: The Defence Services Staff College (DSSC), Wellington is a premier tri-service training establishment imparting training to middle level officers (Majors and equivalent) of the three wings of Indian Armed Forces, friendly foreign countries and Indian Civil Services. The DSSC is located in picturesque settings at Wellington, near Conoor in The Nilgiris mountains of Tamil Nadu State.
Military Institute of Technology (MILIT), Pune: MILIT is an inter-services technical training institution of the Ministry of Defence of the Republic of India. It conducts Defence Services Technical Staff Course (DSTSC), Tank Technology Course (TTC) and train officers of the three Services of Indian Armed Forces and officers from friendly foreign countries for command and staff appointments.
National Defence Academy: The National Defence Academy (NDA), Khadakwasla is a premier Inter-Service training institution where future officers of Armed Forces are trained. The training involves an exacting schedule of three years before the cadets join their respective Service Academics, viz., Indian Military Academy, Naval Academy and Air Force Academy.
Military Intelligence Training School and Depot (MITSD), Pune: Set up in 1942, the institution continues to train intelligence professionals of the three services as well as from the paramilitary forces, civil agencies and friendly foreign countries.

Medical Personnel

 Armed Forces Medical College (AFMC)

The AFMC is located in Pune, Maharashtra. It is an inter-services institution. AFMC has multiple roles to perform. They are primarily training of medical undergraduates and post-graduates, dental postgraduates, nursing cadets and paramedical staff. Patient care forms an integral part of its training curriculum and the attached hospital benefits from the expertise available at AFMC. The institution is responsible for providing the entire pool of specialists and super-specialists to Armed Forces by giving them in-service training.

The AFMC is well known as one of the premier medical institutions of India, and its entrance is through National Eligibility cum Entrance Test for which lakhs of students appear. The students compete for its 150 seats (30 for female cadets and 115 for male cadets) out of which 5 are reserved for cadets from friendly foreign countries . Selected candidates are also required to pass a medical and fitness test, which is at par with the one for Officer Cadets. On the completion of the five-year course, the medical cadets are granted short service commission for seven years or permanent commission in the Indian Army, Navy, or Air Force, which includes a one year internship, after which the officers are detailed for Medical Officers' Basic Course (MOBC) at the Officers' Training School at AMC Centre and School at Lucknow for basic military training as well as training in battle-field medicine.

 College of Nursing, Army Hospital (R&R)

See also
 Indian National Defence University
 Sainik school

References

Military academies of India
Military education and training in India